Stockcity Girl is the debut studio album by Swedish singer Paola Bruna, released in 2002. It was preceded by the lead single, "Above the Candystore", which peaked at number twenty-six on the Swedish Singles Chart.

Track listing
"Get Some" – 1:18
"Fine Without You" – 2:59
"Above the Candystore" – 3:17
"Yours to Keep" – 3:15
"Back Then" – 2:26
"Hang with Me" – 3:29
"Interstellar Love" – 3:21
"Allt på ett kort" – 1:31
"The Girl U Want" – 3:01
"Keep It Out of My Face" – 2:58
"Stockcity Girl" – 3:20
"Never Had Never Will" – 2:36
"Sinus" – 1:09

Charts

References

2002 albums